Department for Education and Skills may refer to:

Department of Education and Skills (Ireland), a government department in Ireland, formerly called the Department of Education and Science.
Department for Education and Skills (Wales), a government department in Wales.
Department for Education and Skills (United Kingdom), a government department in the United Kingdom from 2001 to 2007.